The Iowa Stars, later known as the Iowa Chops, were a professional ice hockey team in the American Hockey League. The club was based in Des Moines, Iowa at the Wells Fargo Arena.

History
The Stars were founded by Howard Baldwin, of Hockey Holdings & Management Group, and Dallas businessman Bob Schlegel, who took the dormant Louisville Panthers AHL franchise and resurrected it for the 2005–06 season as the Iowa Stars (the same name as an earlier team in 1969-70 in the Central Hockey League). They had a five-year affiliation agreement with the Dallas Stars and a one-year agreement with the Anaheim Ducks.

In their inaugural season, the Stars made it to the Calder Cup playoffs first round, where they were defeated by the Milwaukee Admirals. The Stars won their first playoff series the following season, defeating the Omaha Ak-Sar-Ben Knights in six games.

In February 2008, the Dallas Stars announced they would be affiliating with the future Texas Stars pending the 2009 completion of the Cedar Park Entertainment Center in Cedar Park, Texas. After the 2007–08 AHL season, the Dallas Stars left the Iowa scene, and the Anaheim Ducks announced an affiliation with the team.

On July 9, 2008, the team unveiled its new name and logo, featuring a "vicious boar’s head in the team colors of crimson, grey and black".

Portland Pirates assistant Gord Dineen was named head coach of the Iowa Chops on August 19, 2008.

On May 9, 2009, the Anaheim Ducks dropped their affiliation with the Chops, leaving Iowa to look for their third NHL affiliate in four seasons.

On July 7, 2009, the Iowa Chops franchise was suspended by the AHL's board of governors for the 2009-10 AHL season for being "unable to remedy certain violations of the provisions of the league’s Constitution and By-Laws." While the AHL declined further comment on the reasons for the suspension, the Des Moines Register reported in June, 2009, that the Chops had violated league rules by pledging the team as collateral for a $1.99 million loan from Wachovia.  The Register also reported that the Ducks had dropped their affiliation with the Chops after the Chops missed payments on their affiliation contract.

After several months of speculation as to their future, the AHL announced on May 4, 2010, that the Texas Stars had acquired the Chops franchise. This transaction finalized the Stars' contractual obligation to acquire a permanent franchise in the league, as they operated in 2009–10 as an expansion team under a provisional agreement to obtain an existing franchise license.

Season-by-season results

Regular season

Playoffs

Team records

Single game
Goals: 4  Vojtech Polak (2006–07)
Penalty Minutes: 32  David Berube (2005–06)

Single season
Goals: 35  Loui Eriksson (2005–06)
Assists: 47  Toby Petersen (2005–06)
Points: 73  Toby Petersen (2005–06)
Penalty Minutes: 189  Brennan Evans (2008–09)
GAA: 2.5  Mike Smith (2005–06)
SV%: .917  Mike Smith (2005–06)

Career
Career Goals: 49  Toby Petersen (2005–08)
Career Assists: 83  Toby Petersen (2005–08)
Career Points: 132  Toby Petersen (2005–08)
Career Penalty Minutes: 189  Brennan Evans (2008–09) 
Career Goaltending Wins: 25  Mike Smith (2005–06)
Career Shutouts: 3  Mike Smith (2005–06)
Career Games: 132  Yared Hagos (2005–07)

Affiliates
 Edmonton Oilers (2005-2006)
 Dallas Stars (2005-2008)
 Anaheim Ducks (2008-2009)

References

External links
Official website

 
Ice hockey teams in Iowa
Ice hockey clubs disestablished in 2009
Ice hockey clubs established in 2005
2005 establishments in Iowa
2009 disestablishments in Iowa
Sports in Des Moines, Iowa
Anaheim Ducks minor league affiliates
Dallas Stars minor league affiliates